The 1875 Ontario general election was the third general election held in the Province of Ontario, Canada.  It was held on January 18, 1875, to elect the 88 Members of the 3rd Legislative Assembly of Ontario ("MLAs").

The Ontario Liberal Party, led by Oliver Mowat, increased its majority in the Legislature for its second term in government.

The Ontario Conservative Party, led by Matthew Crooks Cameron lost four of its seats.

Redistribution of ridings
The Assembly was increased from 82 to 88 members, through the following changes:

Results

This was the first election in which paper ballots were used. Previously, votes were cast by public declaration.

See also
Politics of Ontario
List of Ontario political parties
Premier of Ontario
Leader of the Opposition (Ontario)

References 

1875
1875 elections in Canada
1875 in Ontario
January 1875 events